The 1950 Wightman Cup was the 22nd edition of the annual women's team tennis competition between the United States and Great Britain. It was held at the All England Lawn Tennis and Croquet Club in London in England in the United Kingdom.

References

1950
1950 in tennis
1950 in American tennis
1950 in British sport
1950 in women's tennis
1950 sports events in London
1950 in English tennis